Insurance Services Office, Inc. (ISO), a subsidiary of Verisk Analytics, is a provider of statistical, actuarial, underwriting, and claims information and analytics; compliance and fraud identification tools; policy language; information about specific locations; and technical services. ISO serves insurers, reinsurers, agents and brokers, insurance regulators, risk managers, and other participants in the property/casualty insurance marketplace. Headquartered in Jersey City, New Jersey, United States, the organization serves clients with offices throughout the United States, along with international operations offices in the United Kingdom, Israel, Germany, India and China.

Overview
ISO was formed in 1971 as an advisory and rating organization for the property/casualty insurance industry to provide statistical and actuarial services, to develop insurance programs, and to assist insurance companies in meeting state regulatory requirements. It became a wholly owned subsidiary of Verisk Analytics in October 2009.

ISO provides a number of risk-related services to its clients:

Fire and building code information
Insurance lines services 
 Including standardized text for insurance forms
Collecting the data 
Insurance products for agents
Workers' compensation
Medicare compliance and claims resolution services

ISO's databases contain more than 19 billion detailed records relating to insurance and risk management, which form the basis for its information services, with two billion records collected each year. ISO employs many members of the Casualty Actuarial Society and other insurance professionals to develop its risk-related products and services.

References

External links
ISO website
Yahoo-Finance page on ISO

Actuarial firms
Financial services companies established in 1971
Companies based in Jersey City, New Jersey
Financial services companies based in New Jersey